The 2021 Mallorca Championships was a men's tennis tournament played on outdoor grass courts. It was the inaugural edition of the Mallorca Championships, and part of the ATP Tour 250 series of the 2021 ATP Tour. It was held at the Santa Ponsa Tennis Academy in Santa Ponsa, Spain, from 19 June until 26 June 2021.

Champions

Singles 

  Daniil Medvedev def.  Sam Querrey, 6–4, 6–2.

Doubles 

  Simone Bolelli /  Máximo González def.  Novak Djokovic /  Carlos Gómez-Herrera, walkover

Points and prize money

Point distribution

Prize money 

*per team

ATP singles main draw entrants

Seeds

1 Rankings are as of 14 June 2021.

Other entrants
The following players received wildcards into the main draw:
  Roberto Bautista Agut
  Daniil Medvedev
  Dominic Thiem 

The following players received entry from the qualifying draw:
  Roberto Carballés Baena
  Lukáš Klein
  Nicola Kuhn
  Lucas Pouille

Withdrawals
Before the tournament
  Jérémy Chardy → replaced by  Stefano Travaglia
  Federico Delbonis → replaced by  Corentin Moutet
  Nick Kyrgios → replaced by  Jiří Veselý

During the tournament
  Ugo Humbert

Retirements
  Dominic Thiem

ATP doubles main draw entrants

Seeds

1 Rankings are as of June 14, 2021.

Other entrants
The following pairs received wildcards into the doubles main draw:
  Novak Djokovic /  Carlos Gómez-Herrera
  Marc López /  Jaume Munar

The following pair received entry as an alternate:
  Guido Pella /  João Sousa

Withdrawals
Before the tournament
  Wesley Koolhof /  Jean-Julien Rojer → replaced by  Jonathan Erlich /  Andrei Vasilevski
  Tim Pütz /  Michael Venus → replaced by  Adrian Mannarino /  Miguel Ángel Reyes Varela
  Sander Gillé /  Joran Vliegen → replaced by  Roman Jebavý /  Jiří Veselý
  Pablo Andújar /  Pablo Carreño Busta → replaced by  Guido Pella /  João Sousa
During the tournament
  Novak Djokovic /  Carlos Gómez-Herrera

References

External links
 Official website

Mallorca Championships
Mallorca Championships
Mallorca Championships
Mallorca Championships